Systolic heart murmurs are heart murmurs heard during systole, i.e. they begin and end between S1 and S2. Many involve stenosis of the semilunar valves or regurgitation of the atrioventricular valves.

Types
 Mid-systolic ejection murmurs are due to blood flow through the semilunar valves. They occur at the start of blood ejection — which starts after S1 — and ends with the cessation of the blood flow — which is before S2. Therefore, the onset of a midsystolic ejection murmur is separated from S1 by the isovolumic contraction phase; the cessation of the murmur and the S2 interval is the aortic or pulmonary hangout time. The resultant configuration of this murmur is a crescendo-decrescendo murmur. Causes of midsystolic ejection murmurs include outflow obstruction, increased flow through normal semilunar valves, dilation of aortic root or pulmonary trunk, or structural changes in the semilunar valves without obstruction.
 Late systolic murmurs start after S1 and, if left sided, extend up to S2, usually in a crescendo manner. Causes include mitral valve prolapse, tricuspid valve prolapse and papillary muscle dysfunction.
 Holosystolic (pansystolic) murmurs start at S1 and extend up to S2. They are usually due to regurgitation in cases such as mitral regurgitation, tricuspid regurgitation, or ventricular septal defect (VSD).

Individual murmurs

Mid-systolic ejection

Late systolic

Holosystolic (pansystolic)

References

Heart murmurs